Mandaryna.com is the début album by Polish singer, dancer and actress Mandaryna, released in 2004.

The album included covers of "Here I Go Again" by Whitesnake, "L'Été indien" by Joe Dassin and "Bo z dziewczynami" by Jerzy Połomski. "Here I Go Again" and "L'Été indien" were released as singles in 2004 and became successful in Poland.

Mandaryna.com reached number 8 in Polish albums chart and was certified gold in Poland.

In 2021, a remastered version of the album called "Mandaryna One" was released.

Track listing
"Here I Go Again" – 3:07
"L'Été indien" – 3:51
"Drifting" – 3:32
"I Feel the Rhythm" – 3:27
"Lost in Your Eyes" – 3:57
"Jeanny" – 4:00
"Mueve tu cuerpo loco" – 3:30
"Bo z dziewczynami" – 3:48
"Sun" – 3:29
"Just Kiss Me" – 3:57
"Always" – 3:56
"Love Is Just a Game" – 3:45
"Jesteś ale cię nie ma" – 3:08

Release history

References

2004 albums
Mandaryna albums